Analog is a free web log analysis computer program that runs under Windows, macOS, Linux, and most Unix-like operating systems. It was first released on June 21, 1995, by Stephen Turner as generic freeware; the license was changed to the GNU General Public License in November 2004. The software can be downloaded for several computing platforms, or the source code can be downloaded and compiled if desired.

Analog has support for 35 languages, and provides the ability to do reverse DNS lookups on log files, to indicate where web site hits originate. It can analyze several different types of web server logs, including Apache, IIS, and iPlanet. It has over 200 configuration options and can generate 32 reports. It also supports log files for multiple virtual hosts.

The program is comparable to Webalizer or AWStats, though it does not use as many images, preferring to stick with simple bar charts and lists to communicate similar information.
Analog can export reports in a number of formats including HTML, XHTML, XML, Latex and a delimited output mode (for example CSV) for importing into other programs. Delimited or "computer" output from Analog is often used to generate more structured and graphically rich reports using the third party Report Magic program.

The popularity of Analog is largely unknown as no download count information has been released on its historic dissemination. In a 1998 survey by the Graphic, Visualization, & Usability Center (GVU), Analog was reportedly used by 24.9% (up from 19.9% the year before), with its nearest rival, Web Trends holding some 20.3% of the market.

It is not clear how Analog's usage has changed in the decade leading up to 2010, nor how its usage profile has been impacted by on-line analysis services such as Google Analytics. Analog can operate on an individual or web-farm basis from a single process, requiring no modification of web page or web script code in order to use it. It is a stand-alone utility, and it is not possible for visiting clients to block all of the logging of traffic directly from the client.

Analog has not been officially updated since the version 6.0 release in December 2004. The original author moved on to commercial traffic analysis. Updates to Analog continued informally by its user community up until the end of 2009 on the official mailing list. Currently the only formally compiled updated redistributable of Analog is that of Analog CE, which has focused on fixing issues in Analog's XML DTD and on adding new operating system and web browser detection to the original code branch.

History
Analog was first released in June 1995, as research project by its creator Dr. Stephen Turner, then working as a research fellow in Sidney Sussex College in the University of Cambridge. Some of the larger release milestones include:

14 June 1995 Analog 0.8b, the initial full testing build.

29 June 1995 Analog 0.9b was the first public release of Analog.

12 September 1995 Analog 1.0 was the first stable release.

10 February 1997 Analog 2.0 was the initial release of a native Win32 version of Analog.

15 June 1998 Analog 3.0 included support for HTTP/1.1 status codes and included a more refined log parsing engine in addition to the ability to parse non-standard log file formats.

16 November 1999 Analog 4.0 supported new reports including the Organisation Report, Operating System Report, Search Word Report, Search Query Report and Processing Time Report.

1 May 2001 Analog 5.0 is released with support for 24 languages, a range of new configuration commands and a new LaTeX output format.

19 December 2004 Analog 6.0 is released, including support for Palm OS and Symbian OS detection and all other changes from its 21-month beta period. Analog 6.0 was the first stable release made available under GPL license terms.

2 October 2007 Analog 6.0.1 C:Amie Edition the first release of the C:Amie maintenance branch. Included support for Windows Vista, improved support for Windows 3.11 and Windows NT 3.5 detection and allowed for the detection of the NetFront browser.

 4 April 2009 Analog 6.0.4 C:Amie Edition was a bug fix release to Analog 6.0, containing bug fixes to Analog's XML output rendering and new configuration options.

18 July 2011 Analog 6.0.8 C:Amie Edition, with support for Windows Phone 7.5 (Mango), Apple iOS 5.0 and all current Android releases.

17 August 2012 Analog 6.0.9 C:Amie Edition, with new operating system identification profiles for Android 4.1 Jelly Bean, Windows Phone 6.5, Windows Phone 8.0, Windows 8 and Windows Server 2012. For the first time, the release expands out the previously grouped operating system detection for Mac OS X so that version number breakdowns are provided where information is available via user agent entries in log-file. The release also includes a number of bug fixes.

7 October 2013 Analog 6.0.11 C:Amie Edition, with improved accuracy in MSIE compatibility mode detection and new detection profiles for iOS, Android, Windows Phone and Windows 8/Server 2012 R2.

28 June 2015 Analog 6.0.12 C:Amie Edition, with new detection profiles for iOS, OS X, Android, Edge, Windows Phone and Windows 10.
27 July 2019Analog CE 6.0.16 added a new ANONYMIZERURL setting to allow the use of a URL forwarding service on reports, a new LINKNOFOLLOW setting to enable/disable hyperlink rel="nofollow" on reports (set to on by default), changed Mac OS X branding with macOS and other improvements to the Operating System report.

A full list of the changes in each release is recorded in the Analog What's New Changelog.

A full list of changes in the maintenance release is recorded on the Analog C:Amie Edition page.

References

External links
 
 Analog CE
 Analog Mailing List

Internet Protocol based network software
Free web analytics software
Web log analysis software